Elections were held in the Australian state of Queensland on 17 May 1969 to elect the 78 members of the Legislative Assembly of Queensland.

The Country-Liberal Coalition won its fifth consecutive victory since it won government in 1957.  It was also the Coalition's first victory under new leader Joh Bjelke-Petersen after the brief premierships of Gordon Chalk and Jack Pizzey, who in turn had succeeded Frank Nicklin when he had retired the previous year.

The election campaign was characterised by tension between the governing coalition partners.

Key dates

Candidates

By the close of nominations on 17 April, 247 candidates had nominated—two more than at the 1966 election. The Courier-Mail reported the following split of candidates by party:

Six of the 78 seats—Albert, Bundaberg, Cairns, South Coast, Toowoomba West and Townsville North—had three-cornered contests between the Labor, Liberal and Country parties.

Results

The election resulted in another win for the Coalition, but a strengthening of the Country Party's position vis-a-vis the Liberal Party. Labor gained back two seats held by ex-Labor ministers who had defected in the 1957 split when both retired, and gained one seat off each of the coalition partners; however, the Country party gained the seat of Burdekin following the conservative independent incumbent's retirement. Labor retained Isis, which it had gained unexpectedly at a November 1968 by-election from the Country Party following Premier Jack Pizzey's death.

|}

Seats changing hands

 Members listed in italics did not recontest their seats.
 In addition, Labor retained the seat of Isis, which it had won from the Country party at the 1968 by-election.

Post-election pendulum

See also
 Members of the Queensland Legislative Assembly, 1966–1969
 Members of the Queensland Legislative Assembly, 1969–1972
 Bjelke-Petersen Ministry

References

Elections in Queensland
1969 elections in Australia
1960s in Queensland
May 1969 events in Australia